Ichoda is a town in Adilabad district in the state of Telangana in India.

Geography
It has an average elevation of 444 meters (1459 feet) above mean sea level.

Demographics
According to Indian census, 2021, the demographic details of Ichoda mandal is as follows:
 Total Population: 	52,179	in 11,373 Households. 	
 Male Population: 	26,265 	and Female Population: 	26,575		
 Children Under 6 years of age: 8,090	(Boys – 4,164 and Girls – 3,926)
 Total Literates: 	27,272

Villages
The villages in Ichoda mandal includes: Jamidi, Adegaon-K,Adegoan-B,Boregaon, Dhabha, Dharampuri, Girjam, Gundala, Ichoda, Keshavpatnam, Kokasmannur, Malyal, Mankapur, Mokhra, Navegaon, Narsapur, Sirichalma, Soanpalle, Talamadri, Raiguda, Chincholi, Girjam, Jamdi, and Junni.

Transport
National Highway 7, now NH-44 (the largest NH in India) passes through Ichoda making the road transport most easy. It is well connected to rest of India by road. Hyderabad is 275 km from here.the nearest railway station is Adilabad (32.9 km). The nearest airport is Nagpur international airport( Dr. Babasaheb Ambedkar International Airport, 220.3 km).

~The nearest railway station in and around Ichoda

The nearest railway station to Ichoda is Adilabad which is located in and around 29.6 kilometer distance. The following table shows other railway stations and its distance from Mamakudi.

Adilabad railway station	29.6 KM.

Kinwat railway station	33.6 KM.

Saharsrakund railway station	46.4 KM.

Pimpalkhuti railway station	46.8 KM.

Himayatnagar railway station	61.0 KM.

Nearest airport to Ichoda

Ichoda‘s nearest airport is Nizamabad Airport situated at 91.9 KM distance. Few more airports around Ichoda are as follows.

Nizamabad Airport	91.9 KM.

Chandrapur Airport	102.5 KM.

Yavatmal Airport	110.5 KM.

Nearest districts to Ichoda

Ichoda is located around 29.4 kilometer away from its district head quarter adilabad. The other nearest district head quarters is nuapada situated at 42.4 KM distance from Ichoda . Surrounding districts from Ichoda are as follows.

Nizamabad ( nizamabad ) district	91.9 KM.

Chandrapur ( chandrapur ) district	106.9 KM.

Yavatmal ( yavatmal ) district	114.4 KM.

Nanded ( nanded ) district	125.1 KM.

Nearest town/city to Ichoda

Ichoda‘s nearest town/city/important place is Adilabad located at the distance of 27.0 kilometer. Surrounding town/city/TP/CT from Ichoda are as follows.

Adilabad	27.0 KM.

Kinwat	33.1 KM.

Nirmal	37.8 KM.

Bhainsa	61.2 KM.

Kallur	71.2 KM.

Ichoda nearest schools has been listed as follows.

Proposed Dental College Converted To School	25.7 KM.

St Joseph S Convent High School	27.8 KM.

C Ram Reddy High School	27.8 KM.

C Ram Reddy M School	28.2 KM.

Little Star School	28.3 KM.

Beaches in and around Ichoda

Ichoda‘s nearest beach is Ennore Beach located at the distance of 717.8 kilometers. Surrounding beaches from Ichoda are as follows.

Ennore Beach	717.8 KM.

Thiruvottiyur Beach	723.5 KM.

Marina Beach	735.5 KM.

Santhome Beach	738.5 KM.

Elliots Beach	740.7 KM.

Education
Vivekananda Junior and Degree College is a first Degree College in Ichoda Mandal. Established in 2006, under the management of Surukunti Sridhar Reddy and Surukunti Srinivas Reddy located 1 kilometers from the town providing quality education. 
Avanthi Junior college and Degree college.
Sai Sammanth Junior & Degree College.
Chatrapati junior and Degree College in Ichoda Mandal. Established in 2010, under the Management of 
Shyam Sundher Reddy Located 200 Miters From the town Providing quality education.

Schools
 Al-Madina Urdu School – The first Urdu medium private school provides quality education as well as deeniyath and Arabic as special subjects.
 Pragathi Patashala Ichoda is one of the oldest schools in Ichoda.
 SR High School Ichoda E/M
 Zilla Parishad High School
 B.P.R.School Ichoda
 Saraswati Shishu Mandir
 Al Madina Urdu school
 Vivekananda High School E/M
 TTWR SCHOOL GIRLS E/M ECHODA
 TTWR Jr COLLEGE  GIRLS E/M ECHODA
 TTWRURJC COLLEGE BOYS E/M ECHODA ( PRCL : A.RAJENDRA PRASAD , V.P : T.NAGESHWAR RAO )
 TTWR SCHOOL BOYS E/M
 First Step School Ichoda E/M
 SunShine School Ichoda E/M
 Golden leaf school Ichoda E/M

Places of interest
Ichoda has more than 12 temples, 5 mosques and 2 churches. Ichoda Mandal Headquarter has a primary health care center, State bank of Hyderabad, State Bank of India, telangana Co-operative bank, Police Station located in the southern part of the town.

 Kuntala Waterfall is 25.7 km from Ichoda.
 Kawal tiger reserve is 92.3 km from Ichoda.
 Pochera waterfalls is 19.2 km from Ichoda.
 Gnana Saraswati Temple, Basar|Basara Saraswathi Temple is 127.2 km from Ichoda.
 Jainadh Suryanarayan Swami Temple(4th-9th century) is 54 km from Ichoda.
 Sirchalma shivalayam(11th-12th century) 15 km from Ichoda.
 Gayatri waterfalls located 16 km from Ichoda(5 km trek from tarnam village).

References 

Census towns in Adilabad district